Burul is a village and a gram panchayat within the jurisdiction of the Nodakhali police station in the Budge Budge II CD block in the Alipore Sadar subdivision of the South 24 Parganas district in the Indian state of West Bengal.

Geography

Area overview
Alipore Sadar subdivision is the most urbanized part of the South 24 Parganas district. 59.85% of the population lives in the urban areas and 40.15% lives in the rural areas. In the northern portion of the subdivision (shown in the map alongside) there are 21 census towns. The entire district is situated in the Ganges Delta and the subdivision, on the east bank of the Hooghly River, is an alluvial stretch, with industrial development.

Note: The map alongside presents some of the notable locations in the subdivision. All places marked in the map are linked in the larger full screen map.

Location

Demographics
According to the 2011 Census of India, Burul had a total population of 7,014, of which 3,589 (51%) were males and 3,425 (49%) were females. There were 680 persons in the age range of 0 to 6 years. The total number of literate people in Burul was 5,117 (80.79% of the population over 6 years).

Transport
A short stretch of local roads link Burul to the Budge Budge Trunk Road.

Budge Budge railway station is located nearby.

Education
Saheed Anurup Chandra Mahavidyalaya established in 1991, is affiliated with the University of Calcutta. It offers honours courses in Bengali, English, history, political science, and geography , and general courses in arts, science and commerce.

Healthcare
There is a primary health centre, with 6 beds, at Burul.

References

Villages in South 24 Parganas district